These are links to lists of hospitals around the world. According to Cybermetrics Lab, they completed their rankings from over 16,500 hospitals worldwide in 2015.

By continent 
Lists of hospitals in Africa
Lists of hospitals in Asia
Lists of hospitals in Europe
Lists of hospitals in North America
Lists of hospitals in Oceania
Lists of hospitals in South America

By size 

List of countries by hospital beds
List of largest hospital campuses, a list of large hospitals ranked by bed capacity and staffing within a single campus
List of largest hospital networks, a list of large hospitals ranked by bed capacity and staffing within a hospital network
List of tallest hospitals

See also
 List of OECD countries by hospital beds

References 

 
Lists by continent